Peter Fearnley Hullah (born 7 May 1949) is a British former Anglican bishop who was Bishop of Ramsbury.

Education and ministry
Hullah was educated at Bradford Grammar School and King's College London. He was ordained in 1974 and was a curate at St Michael and All Angels, Summertown, Oxford, and then chaplain (from 1978) and housemaster of the International Centre (1982-1985) at Sevenoaks School, chaplain of The King's School, Canterbury and headmaster of Chetham's School of Music before being ordained to the episcopate. He was Bishop of Ramsbury from 1999 to 2005 when he became principal of the Northampton Academy. He is now director of Hopeful Leadership Ltd and a consultant to various charities including Together for Sudan.

Chetham's School of Music sex abuse scandal

When Hullah was headteacher of Chetham’s School of Music (1992–1999), he witnessed Michael Brewer, the school's director of music, sexually abusing a pupil, but chose to deal with the incident by announcing that Brewer had taken early retirement on the grounds of ill health, in order to preserve the reputation of the school and the perpetrator.

Brewer was paid his full salary from when he left Chetham’s in December 1994 until August 1995, which Hullah considered to be a gesture of goodwill on the part of the governing body. Brewer continued to be associated with Chetham’s as an advisor and to work closely with young people as the artistic director of the National Youth Choir. Hullah did not notify the National Youth Choir, the local authority or the Department for Education (which at that time operated List 99, a barred list of those deemed unsuitable to work with children) of the circumstances or the fact of Brewer's resignation, although there was a statutory duty to notify the Department for Education of such resignations. Hullah did not consider that the circumstances of Brewer's resignation were such as to require any referrals or notification.

Under clergy discipline for historic misconduct
Following complaints of sexual misconduct against him, Hullah was seen before a bishop's tribunal in 2022. He pleaded guilty and subsequently the Archbishop of Canterbury imposed the penalty of "prohibition for life" from exercising any ministerial functions in the Church of England.

Role in the City of London
Hullah became the master of the Worshipful Company of Woolmen in September 2022.

References

1949 births
Living people
People educated at Bradford Grammar School
Alumni of King's College London
Associates of King's College London
Bishops of Ramsbury
20th-century Church of England bishops
21st-century Church of England bishops